Saint-Aubin-sur-Mer is the name of two communes in France:

 Saint-Aubin-sur-Mer, Calvados, in the Calvados département
 Saint-Aubin-sur-Mer, Seine-Maritime, in the Seine-Maritime département